Security Trust and Savings, also known as Security Pacific Bank, is a highrise office building in Hollywood, California and built in 1921.  The building was designed by the father and son design team of John and Donald Parkinson, who also designed some of the city's major landmarks, including Los Angeles City Hall and Bullocks Wilshire.  In 1983, the Security Trust and Savings building was listed on the National Register of Historic Places.

See also
List of Registered Historic Places in Los Angeles

References

Buildings and structures in Hollywood, Los Angeles
Office buildings in Los Angeles
Commercial buildings completed in 1921
Bank buildings on the National Register of Historic Places in California
Commercial buildings on the National Register of Historic Places in Los Angeles
John and Donald Parkinson buildings